Hit the Hay is a 1945 American film musical starring Judy Canova.

Cast
Judy Canova
Ross Hunter

References

External links
Hit the Hay at IMDb
hit the Hay at TCMDB
Hit the Hay at Letterbox

1945 films
1945 musical films
American musical films
American black-and-white films
1940s American films